Guessable is a British panel show broadcast on Comedy Central UK, in which panelists play games that revolve around guessing. It began its run in October 2020 and was renewed for a second series of twelve episodes in March 2021. The show is hosted by Sara Pascoe with assistant John Kearns and has team captains Alan Davies and Darren Harriott. In November 2021, the show was confirmed to be returning for a third series of 12 episodes, which began in January 2022, and resumed on 5 September 2022.

A fourth series was confirmed in September 2022 and began airing in January 2023.

Format
Each episode typically has 5 rounds with a final extra game where the contestant have to guess the identity of a mystery celebrity that has ties to all the answers called in that episode. Round formats include 'What Am I', where one guest sticks their head through various cut-outs and has to guess who they are, based on the cutout, 'Say It Properly', where contestants have to guess a word represented by a series of props on a board, 'What Are You Porking About?', where each contestant on one team gets a box and two have to lie about an object being in theirs while one tells the truth. The other team then has to guess who actually has an object in their box.

The episode always ends with an extra round where panelists must guess the identity of a mystery celebrity. Clues to the identity come in the form of correct answers from previous rounds – each of them is tied to the celebrity in some way.

Episodes
The coloured backgrounds denote the result of each of the shows:
 – indicates Alan's team won
 – indicates Darren's team won
 – indicates the game ended in a draw

Series 1 (2020)

Series 2 (2021)

Series 3 (2022)

Series 4 (2023)

A further six episodes will air later in 2023.

Notes

References

External links

2020 British television series debuts
2020s British comedy television series
2020s British game shows
British panel games
British stand-up comedy television series
Comedy Central game shows
English-language television shows